The Cincinnati Kids were a soccer team based out of Cincinnati that played in the original Major Indoor Soccer League. They played only in the 1978–79 MISL season and were partially owned by Pete Rose. Their home arena was Riverfront Coliseum. In the Kids' only season in Cincinnati the average attendance was 3,191 per game.

Owner
 Pete Rose

Coach
 Len Bilous

Home Games At Riverfront Coliseum

 December 27, 1978 – vs Philadelphia Fever
 January 5, 1979 – vs New York Arrows
 January 7, 1979 – vs Houston Summit
 January 14, 1979 – vs Cleveland Force
 January 25, 1979 – vs Pittsburgh Spirit
 February 6, 1979 – vs Pittsburgh Spirit
 February 10, 1979 – vs Moscow Spartak
 February 13, 1979 – vs Houston Summit
 March 3, 1979 – vs Houston Summit
 March 4, 1979 – vs Cleveland Force
 March 10, 1979 – vs Philadelphia Fever
 March 18, 1979 – vs Pittsburgh Spirit

In popular culture
The Cincinnati Kids are referenced in "Sparky", an episode of the TV show WKRP in Cincinnati which guest-starred baseball great Sparky Anderson as himself. Anderson is hired by the station as host of a new sports talk radio program, and his first guest is the captain of the Cincinnati Kids, Derek Doogle, played by Andrew Bloch. The episode first aired December 24, 1979 after the team had folded.

External links
The Year in American Soccer – 1979
Cincinnati Kids roster

Defunct indoor soccer clubs in the United States
K
Soccer clubs in Ohio
Major Indoor Soccer League (1978–1992) teams
1978 establishments in Ohio
1979 disestablishments in Ohio
Association football clubs established in 1978
Association football clubs disestablished in 1979